Telicota eurychlora, the dingy darter, is a butterfly of the family Hesperiidae. It is found in Australia along the south-eastern coast of New South Wales and the north-eastern coast of Queensland.

The larvae feed on Cladium procerum.

External links
Australian Faunal Directory

Taractrocerini
Butterflies described in 1908